Wu Yuzhang (given name Yongshan; December 30, 1878 – December 12, 1966) was a Chinese politician, educator, and president of Renmin University of China from 1950 to 1966.

Biography
Wu Yuzhang was born in Rong County, Sichuan in 1878.  He joined the Communist Party of China in 1925.  In the 1940s, when he was in Yan'an, he and Dong Biwu, Lin Boqu, Xu Teli, Xie Juezai were called as Yan'an Five Seniors (延安五老).

Legacy
Wu Yuzhang Honors College, an honors college within Sichuan University, was named in honor of Wu Yuzhang.

Notes

External links
 Introduction to Wu Yuzhang

1878 births
1966 deaths
Communist University of the Toilers of the East alumni
Presidents of Renmin University of China
People from Zigong
Chinese expatriates in France